Protein MRVI1 is a protein that in humans is encoded by the MRVI1 gene.

Function 

This gene is similar to a mouse putative tumor suppressor gene that is frequently disrupted by mouse AIDS-related virus (MRV). The encoded protein, which is found in the membrane of the endoplasmic reticulum, is similar to Jaw1, a lymphoid-restricted protein whose expression is downregulated during myeloid differentiation. Therefore, this gene may be a myeloid leukemia tumor suppressor gene. Several alternatively spliced transcripts have been found for this gene, however, the full-length nature of some variants has not been determined. Of the two characterized variants which encode different isoforms, one initiates translation at a non-AUG start site.

Interactions 

MRVI1 has been shown to interact with ITPR1 and PRKG1.

References

Further reading

External links